Early modern Olympic Games allowed for individuals in a team to be from different nations.  The International Olympic Committee (IOC) grouped their results together under the mixed team designation (IOC code ZZX). A total of 25 medals were won by mixed teams in the first three modern Games, from 1896 to 1904.

Medal tables

Medals by Games

List of medalists of mixed teams

Medals by sport

Medals by nation combination

See also
Australasia at the Olympics, a combined team consisting of Australian and New Zealand competitors, which competed at the 1908 and 1912 Olympic Games
Unified Team at the Olympics, a combined team consisting of competitors from post-Soviet states, which competed at the 1992 Winter and Summer Olympics
Mixed-NOCs at the Youth Olympics

References

External links